Elaeocarpus sericopetalus, commonly known as hard quandong, blueberry ash, hard duandong or northern quandong, is a species of flowering plant in the family Elaeocarpaceae and is endemic to Queensland. It is a tree, sometimes with buttress roots at the base of the trunk, relatively large lenticels, oblong to elliptic leaves, creamy-white flowers with five petals, and deep red to almost black fruit.

Description
The five petals are oblong, slightly longer than, but narrower than the sepals, sometimes with two or three notches on the end and there are about fifty stamens.

Taxonomy
Elaeocarpus sericopetalus was first formally described in 1878 by Ferdinand von Mueller in Fragmenta Phytographiae Australiae from material collected by John Dallachy near Rockingham Bay.

Distribution and habitat

Conservation status
Hard quandong is listed as of "least concern" under the Queensland Government Nature Conservation Act 1992.

References

Oxalidales of Australia
sericopetalus
Flora of Queensland
Plants described in 1868
Endemic flora of Australia
Taxa named by Ferdinand von Mueller